Your Dearest Enemy (German Ihr liebster Feind) is a 1916 German silent film directed by Fritz Bernhardt and starring Reinhold Schünzel and Victor Janson.

Cast
 Lore Giesen
 Helene Hörmann
 Tatjana Irrah
 Reinhold Schünzel
 Magnus Stifter
 Victor Janson

References

Bibliography
 Bock, Hans-Michael & Bergfelder, Tim. The Concise CineGraph. Encyclopedia of German Cinema. Berghahn Books, 2009.

External links

1916 films
Films of the German Empire
German silent feature films
Films directed by Fritz Bernhardt
German black-and-white films
1910s German films